Vars, VARS may refer to:

People 
 Ellen Marie Vars (born 1957), Norwegian Sami author
 Henry Vars (1902–1977), Polish-American musician
 John de Vars Hazard (1888–1968) 
 Láilá Susanne Vars (born 1976), Norwegian Sami lawyer and politician

Places 
 Vars, Ontario, a community within the city limits of Ottawa, Ontario, Canada
 Vars, Charente, a commune in the department of Charente, France
 Vars, Hautes-Alpes, a commune in the department of Hautes-Alpes, France
 Col de Vars, a high mountain pass between Vars and Alpes-de-Haute-Provence, France
 Vars, Haute-Saône, a commune in the department of Haute-Saône, France
 Vars-sur-Roseix, a commune in the department of Corrèze, France

Other uses 
 VARS (Valyl-tRNA synthetase), a human enzyme
 VARS, an organization from the Brave Saga Video games.

See also 
 Var (disambiguation)